Saradha Preetha is an Indian actress in Tamil and Malayalam movies. She was one of the prominent lead and supporting actresses in Malayalam and Tamil movies during 1990s. She came into movie industry as a child artist and later started doing lead roles and supporting roles.

Filmography

TV serials
 Visirikku Verkirathu (DD Chennai, 1991)
 Thirisooli
 Dhik Dhik Dhik

References

External links

Actresses from Thiruvananthapuram
Actresses in Malayalam cinema
Indian film actresses
Actresses in Tamil cinema
Actresses in Telugu cinema
Living people
Actresses in Tamil television
Year of birth missing (living people)
Place of birth missing (living people)
20th-century Indian actresses
Child actresses in Malayalam cinema